Killer at Large is a 1947 American crime film directed by William Beaudine and starring Robert Lowery, Anabel Shaw and Charles Evans.

Plot
Paul Kimberly, a newspaper reporter, quits his job to investigate crooked dealings at a local veterans' housing administration. The newspaper editor assigns reporter Anne Arnold to lure him back to the paper. The two reporters expose an embezzling ring.

Cast

References

Bibliography
 Marshall, Wendy L. William Beaudine: From Silents to Television. Scarecrow Press, 2005.

External links

1947 films
American crime films
American black-and-white films
1947 crime films
1940s English-language films
Films directed by William Beaudine
Films scored by Albert Glasser
Producers Releasing Corporation films
1940s American films